Ivo Rafanelli (born 1 March 1965) is a Croatian naval officer currently serving as Commander of the Croatian Navy.

He graduated from the Naval Military Academy in 1987 as a naval engineer.

References

Living people
1965 births
Croatian admirals
People from Makarska